Amylocorticium is a genus of resupinate (crust-like) fungi in the Amylocorticiaceae family. The genus has a widespread distribution and contains  11 species.

Species
Amylocorticium africanum
Amylocorticium canadense
Amylocorticium cebennense
Amylocorticium cumminsii
Amylocorticium indicum
Amylocorticium mauiense
Amylocorticium pedunculatum
Amylocorticium rhodoleucum
Amylocorticium suaveolens
Amylocorticium subincarnatum
Amylocorticium subsulphureum

References

External links

Amylocorticiales